Daniel Lowe (born November 18, 1992) is an American sports shooter. He competed in the men's 10 metre air rifle and 50 metre rifle three positions events at the 2016 Summer Olympics.

References

External links
 

1992 births
Living people
American male sport shooters
Olympic shooters of the United States
Shooters at the 2016 Summer Olympics
Place of birth missing (living people)